Konin is a city in central Poland.

Konin may also refer to:

Emperor Kōnin (光仁天皇, Kōnin-tennō), emperor of Japan who reigned 770–781
Kōnin (era) (弘仁), a Japanese era name for the years 810–824
Konin, Łódź Voivodeship, a village in central Poland
Konin, Lubusz Voivodeship, a village in west Poland
Konin, Nowy Tomyśl County, a village in Greater Poland Voivodeship (west-central Poland)
Konin, Silesian Voivodeship, a village in south Poland